Woodland is a historic house on the grounds of Sam Houston State University in Huntsville, Texas.  Built in stages beginning about 1847, it was the residence of Sam Houston from 1847 to 1859.  The house is now part of Sam Houston Memorial Museum, and is a National Historic Landmark.

Description and history
Woodland is the centerpiece of the  museum property at the southeast corner of the Sam Houston State University Campus.  It is a -story log structure, finished in wooden clapboards and covered by a gabled roof.  It is a classic dogtrot house, with a central breezeway flanked by rectangular log chambers, with brick chimneys at the ends.  A shed-roof porch extends in front of the breezeway, supported by square posts.  The breezeway includes a winding staircase which provides access to loft spaces used as bedrooms.

The house was little more than a single-room log cabin when Sam Houston began enlarging it in 1847.  In that year, he added the breezeway and second log structure.  Later alterations improved the upper level, including construction of the staircase, and apparently reversing the front and back of the house.  Houston's family occupied the house until 1859, the period during which he served as a United States senator, and as Governor of Texas.   Houston's signature achievements, the independence of Texas and its subsequent annexation to the United States, happened before he took up residence here.

The house is now accompanied by a reconstruction kitchen outbuilding, as well as the restored cabin that he used as a law office.

See also

List of National Historic Landmarks in Texas
National Register of Historic Places listings in Walker County, Texas
Recorded Texas Historic Landmarks in Walker County

References

External links

Sam Houston Memorial Museum

Houses completed in 1847
Historic house museums in Texas
National Historic Landmarks in Texas
Museums in Walker County, Texas
University museums in Texas
Biographical museums in Texas
Sam Houston State University
Houses on the National Register of Historic Places in Texas
1847 establishments in Texas
Sam Houston
National Register of Historic Places in Walker County, Texas